The women's +78 kg judo event at the 2019 European Games in Minsk was held on 24 June at the Čyžoŭka-Arena.

Results

Final

Repechage

Top half

Bottom half

References

External links
 
 Draw Sheet

W79
2019
European W79